The following is a list of statewide initiatives and referendums modifying state law and proposing state constitutional amendments in Oklahoma, sorted by election.

2000s

2004

2010s

2010

2018

2020s

2020

References

Oklahoma ballot measures